The Bristol Twins were a Minor League Baseball team located in Bristol, Virginia, that operated in the Class D Appalachian League between the 1940 and 1955 seasons.

During their history, Twins were an affiliate team of the New York Giants (1942–1951), Pittsburgh Pirates (1952–1953) and New York Yankees (1954–1955). The team played their home games at Shaw Stadium.

In its sixteen seasons of existence, the Bristol Twins advanced to the playoffs series at total of fourteen times, winning the championship in 1942 and 1950.

The Ballpark

The Twins played at Shaw Stadium, located at 1501 Euclid Street, on Gate City Highway. The ballpark had a capacity of 3,500. The site is now a factory.

Notable alumni

 Billy Gardner (1945)
 Art Fowler (1944)
Charlie Fox (1942, 1947)
 Ron Necciai (1952)
 Bobby Thomson (1942) 3 x MLB All-Star

Seasons

Fact
 Ron Necciai pitched for Bristol before joining the Pittsburgh Pirates. On May 13, 1952 Necciai struck out 27 batters while throwing a 7–0 no-hitter against the Welch Miners. Four of the Welch hitters did reach base, including one runner each via a walk, an error, a hit batsman and a passed ball charged to Twins' catcher Harry Dunlop on a swinging third strike. This resulted in a four-strikeout ninth inning. In his next start Necciai threw a 24-strikeout two-hitter, posting a 4-0 record with a 0.42 earned run average and 109 strikeouts in 43 innings of work.

Sources

Defunct baseball teams in Virginia
Defunct Appalachian League teams
Defunct minor league baseball teams
New York Yankees minor league affiliates
Pittsburgh Pirates minor league affiliates
New York Giants minor league affiliates
1940 establishments in Virginia
1955 disestablishments in Virginia